Hermosita is a genus of sea slugs, specifically of aeolid nudibranchs. Only two species are known to belong to this genus, marine gastropod molluscs in the family Facelinidae.

Biology
Both species of Hermosita feed on the hydroid Solanderia; a characteristic shared with the Pleurolidiidae.

Species
Species in this genus include:
 Hermosita hakunamatata (Ortea, Caballer & Espinosa, 2003)
 Hermosita sangria Gosliner & Behrens, 1986

References

Facelinidae